The BeagleBoard is a low-power open-source single-board computer produced by Texas Instruments in association with Digi-Key and Newark element14. The BeagleBoard was also designed with open source software development in mind, and as a way of demonstrating the Texas Instrument's OMAP3530 system-on-a-chip. The board was developed by a small team of engineers as an educational board that could be used in colleges around the world to teach open source hardware and software capabilities. It is also sold to the public under the Creative Commons share-alike license. The board was designed using Cadence OrCAD for schematics and Cadence Allegro for PCB manufacturing; no simulation software was used.

Features

The BeagleBoard measures approximately 75 by 75 mm and has all the functionality of a basic computer. The OMAP3530 includes an ARM Cortex-A8 CPU (which can run Linux, Minix, FreeBSD, OpenBSD, RISC OS, or Symbian; a number of unofficial Android ports exist), a TMS320C64x+ DSP for accelerated video and audio decoding, and an Imagination Technologies PowerVR SGX530 GPU to provide accelerated 2D and 3D rendering that supports OpenGL ES 2.0. Video out is provided through separate S-Video and HDMI connections. A single SD/MMC card slot supporting SDIO, a USB On-The-Go port, an RS-232 serial connection, a JTAG connection, and two stereo 3.5 mm jacks for audio in/out are provided.

Built-in storage and memory are provided through a PoP chip that includes 256 MB of NAND flash memory and 256 MB of RAM (128 MB on earlier models).

The board uses up to 2 W of power and can be powered from the USB connector, or a separate 5 V power supply.

Rev. C4 specifications

 Package on package (PoP) SoC/Memory chip.
 Processor TI OMAP3530 SoC – 720 MHz ARM Cortex-A8 core
 "HD capable" TMS320C64x+ core (520 MHz up to 720p @30 fps)
 Imagination Technologies PowerVR SGX 2D/3D graphics processor supporting dual independent displays
 256 MB LPDDR RAM
 256 MB NAND Flash memory
 Peripheral connections
 DVI-D (HDMI connector chosen for size – maximum resolution is 1280 × 1024 – and it does not output digital audio)
 S-Video
 USB OTG (mini AB)
 1 USB port
 SD/MMC card slot
 Stereo in and out jacks
 RS-232 port
 JTAG connector
 Power socket (5 V barrel connector type)
 Development
 Boot code stored in ROM
 Boot from NAND memory, SD/MMC, USB, or serial
 Alternative boot source button.
 Has been demonstrated using Android, Angstrom Linux, Fedora, Ubuntu, Gentoo, Arch Linux ARM, openSUSE for ARM and Maemo Linux distributions, VxWorks, FreeBSD, the Windows CE operating system, Symbian, QNX and a version of RISC OS 5 made available by RISC OS Open.

BeagleBoard

Features

A modified version of the BeagleBoard called the BeagleBoard-xM started shipping on August 27, 2010. The BeagleBoard-xM measures in at 82.55 by 82.55 mm and has a faster CPU core (clocked at 1 GHz compared to the 720 MHz of the BeagleBoard), more RAM (512 MB compared to 256 MB), onboard Ethernet jack, and 4 port USB hub. The BeagleBoard-xM lacks the onboard NAND and therefore requires the OS and other data to be stored on a microSD card. The addition of the Camera port to the -xM provides a simple way of importing video via Leopard Board cameras.

Specifications
 Package on Package POP CPU/memory chip.
 Processor TI DM3730 Processor – 1 GHz ARM Cortex-A8 core
 'HD capable' TMS320C64x+ core (800 MHz up to 720p @30 fps)
 Imagination Technologies PowerVR SGX 2D/3D graphics processor supporting dual independent displays
 512 MB LPDDR RAM
 4 GB microSD card supplied with the BeagleBoard-xM and loaded with The Angstrom Distribution
 Peripheral connections
 DVI-D (HDMI connector chosen for size – maximum resolution is 1400 x 1050)
 S-Video
 USB OTG (mini AB)
 4 USB ports
 Ethernet 
 MicroSD/MMC card 
Stereo in and out jacks
 RS-232 port
 JTAG connector
 Power socket (5 V barrel connector type)
 Camera port
 Expansion port
 Development
 Boot code stored on the uSD card
 Boot from uSD/MMC only
 Alternative Boot source button.
 Has been demonstrated using Android, Angstrom Linux, Fedora, Ubuntu, Gentoo, Arch Linux ARM and Maemo Linux distributions, FreeBSD, the Windows CE operating system, and RISC OS.

BeagleBone

Announced in the end of October 2011, the BeagleBone is a barebone development board with a Sitara ARM Cortex-A8 processor running at 720 MHz, 256 MB of RAM, two 46-pin expansion connectors, on-chip Ethernet, a microSD slot, and a USB host port and multipurpose device port which includes low-level serial control and JTAG hardware debug connections, so no JTAG emulator is required. The BeagleBone was initially priced at US$89.

A number of BeagleBone "Capes" have recently been released. These capes are expansion boards which can be stacked onto the BeagleBone Board (up to four at one time). BeagleBone capes include but are not limited to:
 LCD touchscreen capes (7" and 3.5")
 DVI-D cape
 Breakout cape
 Breadboard cape 
 CAN bus cape 
 RS-232 cape
 Battery cape

BeagleBone Black

Launched on April 23, 2013, at a price of $45. Among other differences, it increases RAM to 512 MB, it increases the processor clock to 1 GHz, and it adds HDMI and 2 GB of eMMC flash memory. The BeagleBone Black also ships with Linux kernel 3.8, upgraded from the original BeagleBone's Linux kernel 3.2, allowing the BeagleBone Black to take advantage of Direct Rendering Manager (DRM).

BeagleBone Black Revision C (released in 2014) increased the size of the flash memory to 4 GB. This enables it to ship with Debian GNU/Linux installed. Previous revisions shipped with Ångström Linux.

BeagleBoard-X15
The BeagleBoard-X15 is based on the TI Sitara AM5728 processor with two ARM Cortex-A15 cores running at 1.5 GHz, two  ARM Cortex-M4 cores running at 212 MHz and two TI C66x DSP cores running at 700 MHz.
The processor provides USB 3.0 support and has a PowerVR dual-core SGX544 GPU running at 532 MHz.

PocketBeagle
Launched in September 2017, PocketBeagle offers identical computing performance to BeagleBone Black in a physical form factor that offers over 50% reduction in size and 75% reduction in weight, along with over 40% cheaper purchase price (December 2018 MSRP US$25 vs. US$45 for BeagleBone Black). The miniaturization was made possible by using the Octavo Systems OSD3358-SM that shrinks all major subsystems of the BeagleBone Black into a single ceramic package attached using ball grid array. The advantages of the miniaturization come at the cost of removal of all built-in connectors except for a single micro USB port, the removal of on-board eMMC flash storage, and a reduction of header pins from 92 down to 72 due to space constraints, meaning that most capes will either not work at all or need heavy modifications to work with PocketBeagle. Just as the BeagleBone Black's printed circuit board (PCB) is cut to fit snugly in an Altoids mint tin, PocketBeagle's PCB is cut to fit snugly in an Altoids Smalls mint tin. Recommended use cases for PocketBeagle include embedded devices where size and weight considerations are most critical, such as quadcopter drones and other miniaturized robotics, along with handheld gaming applications.

Specifications 

The following operating systems are reported to have obtained support for the hardware used on the boards: Fedora, Android (code named rowboat), Ubuntu, Void Linux, openSUSE and Ångström. The board also supports other OSes such as FreeBSD, NetBSD, OpenBSD, QNX, MINIX 3, RISC OS, and Windows Embedded.

Optional expansion boards
 BeagleBoard Zippy – Feature expander daughter card for BeagleBoard
 BeagleBoard Zippy2 – Second-generation Zippy. (UART, EEPROM, 100BASE-T, SD-Slot, RTC, I²C (5 V))
 BeagleTouch Display – Touchscreen 4.3" OLED panel with touchscreen, and drivers for Angstrom Linux built by Liquidware.
 BeagleLCD2 Expansion Board – 4.3" wide aspect LCD panel + touchscreen with interface board. Developed by HY Research.
 BeagleJuice – Lithium-ion battery pack for portability developed and built by Liquidware.
 WLAN adapter – This additional expansion card enables wireless connectivity functionality for the BeagleBoard.
 BeadaFrame – 7" TFT LCD display kit includes a touch panel and a plastic frame, by NAXING Electronics.
 4DLCD CAPE – 4.3", 480x272 resolution LCD cape with resistive touch or non-touch and seven push buttons
 Vifff-024 – a very sensitive camera allowing capture of video stream at quarter moon illumination. Developed by ViSensi.org.

Optional enclosures
 Beagle Board RevC Clear Acrylic Case – Case for a BeagleBoard alone. (without Zippy2)
 BeagleLCD2 Clear Acrylic Case – Case for BeagleBoard with BeagleLCD2

Tutorials and Technical Resources
BBB GPIO interactive map – An interactive map of the GPIO of the BeagleBone Black
tinkernow.com – DIY website largely based on BeagleBone, resources for setup, operating, and projects.

Clones
 IGEPv2 – a slightly larger board that includes more RAM, built-in Bluetooth and Wi-Fi, a USB host, an Ethernet jack, and use microSD cards instead of regular SD cards.
 ICETEK Mini Board (Chinese)

See also
 Open-source computing hardware
 IOIO

References

External links

 Official website
 BeagleBoard System Reference Manual
 OMAP35x Applications Processors
 Texas Instruments OMAP Developer Network

Embedded Linux
Linux-based devices
Texas Instruments hardware
Single-board computers
Open computers